Max Heilbronner (1902–1964) was a German art director.

Selected filmography
 The Path to God (1924)
 Written in the Stars (1925)
 Hunted People (1926)
 How Do I Marry the Boss? (1927)
 Break-in (1927)
 Poor Little Colombine (1927)
 Klettermaxe (1927)
 The Villa in Tiergarten Park (1927)
 Volga Volga (1928)
 The Duty to Remain Silent (1928)
 Dear Homeland (1929)
 Revolt in the Batchelor's House (1929)
 Pension Schöller (1930)
 Dangers of the Engagement Period (1930)
 Rooms to Let (1930)
 The Emperor's Sweetheart (1931)
 The Testament of Cornelius Gulden (1932)
 An Auto and No Money (1932)
 Overnight Sensation (1932)
 Greetings and Kisses, Veronika (1933)
 The Typist Gets Married (1934)
 A Man Has Been Stolen (1934)
 Fanfare of Love (1935)

References

Bibliography
 Lotte H. Eisner. The Haunted Screen: Expressionism in the German Cinema and the Influence of Max Reinhardt. University of California Press, 2008.

External links

1902 births
1964 deaths
German art directors
Film people from Munich